Pouso Alto (translation: High Landing) is a municipality in the state of Minas Gerais in the Southeast region of Brazil.

The municipality contains 4.39% of the  Serra do Papagaio State Park, created in 1998.

See also
List of municipalities in Minas Gerais

References

Municipalities in Minas Gerais